A general overview and comprehensive discussion of this topic may be found in the article Liberalism.
In general, liberalism in Europe is a political movement that supports a broad tradition of individual liberties and constitutionally-limited and democratically accountable government. These European derivatives of classical liberalism are found in centrist movements and parties as well as some parties on the centre-left and the centre-right.

Liberalism in Europe is broadly divided into two groups, "social" and "conservative". This differs from the American method of dividing liberalism into "modern" (simply liberal) and "classical" (or libertarian), although the two groups are very similar to their European counterparts.

Most liberalism in Europe is conservative or classical, whilst European social liberalism and progressivism is rooted in radicalism, a left-wing classical liberal idea.)

Liberal practices
Liberal political parties have specific policies, which the social scientist can either read from party manifestos, or infer from actual actions and laws passed by ostensibly liberal parties. The sources listed below serve to illustrate some of the current liberal attitudes in Europe.
 the policies of liberal parties in government, including those in coalition arrangements (taking into mind that coalition partners make compromises), since they show what liberals are prepared to accept as well as the policies of liberal parties in opposition
 the positions of the Alliance of Liberals and Democrats for Europe faction in the European Parliament and the Electoral Manifestos of the European Liberal Democrat and Reform Party.
 the forum of the German FDP, which is relatively unmoderated, and illustrates grassroots liberal concerns. Sites of other Liberal parties, e.g. the British Liberal Democrats and the Netherlands' Democrats 66, are more heavily moderated and therefore more representative for the policy of liberal parties.
 the Belgian website / think tank Liberales.be which has longer essays on new liberal policies
 the views and policies of the Open Society Institute, since they explicitly claim to derive from the principles of a major liberal philosopher, Karl Popper.
 the Lisbon Strategy of the European Union, since it is strongly supported by the liberal parties, and sets out a vision of a future Europe.

Additionally, liberal value preferences can be inferred from the liberalisation programmes and policies of the International Monetary Fund and the World Bank.

The liberalism visible in these sources emphasizes in comparison with other ideologies more belief in individual development as a motor for society and the state providing a social safety net. The liberal policies differ from country to country and from party to party.

Ideology 
European liberalism is largely divided into classical (practically economical), social, and conservative–liberalism.

Liberalism in Europe has a different meaning from the signification it has in contemporary politics in the US. In America, liberals might be confused with social-democrats and leftists which advocate for a larger government, some forms of protectionism and more economic interventionism; whereas European liberals usually favor limited government, free trade and adhere to economic liberalism. In the context of European politics, liberal itself generally refers to classical liberal (including both centre-left and centre-right), so classical liberal in European politics means a "centre-right" with a prominent economically liberal tendency. (Germany's FDP is representative.) There is also an evaluation that mainstream conservative liberal (ex. ordoliberalism, Christian democracy, enc.) in Europe have weaker economic liberal tendencies than social liberal. However, some classical liberal (economic liberal), are included in conservative liberal.

European Union 
European liberalists tend to support the European Union such as Emmanuel Macron, President of France who campaigned against Marine Le Pen a National Rally candidate a far right nationalist anti EU party. Some European liberalists support Federalisation of the European Union such as prominent European Liberalist politicians such as Guy Verhofstadt (Prime Minister of Belgium 1999 to 2008), Viviane Reading (Vice-President of the European Commission), and Matteo Renzi (Prime Minister of Italy 2014 to 2016).

Social issues 
Among European liberals, "classical liberals" and "social liberals" support cultural liberalism (ex. LGBT rights issues including same-sex marriage, legalization of some drugs, opening immigration, etc.), but most "conservative liberals", including ordoliberals, Christian democrats and some agrarians, take a socially moderate-to-conservative stance on cultural liberalism. (Finland's Keskusta is representative.)

Parties

Government

See also
 Liberalism by country for discussion of individual states of Europe
 Classical liberalism (mainly economic liberalism)
 Conservative liberalism (right-liberalism)
 Liberal conservatism
 Social liberalism (left-liberalism)
 Liberal socialism
 Libertarianism
 Ordoliberalism
 Radicalism (historical)

Notes

 
Europe
Centrism in Europe
Pro-Europeanism